Christer Löfqvist (born 4 June 1944 in Visby, Gotland, Sweden - died 1 February 1978) was an international speedway rider who reached the final of the Speedway World Championship in 1974.

He competed in Great Britain for West Ham Hammers, Poole Pirates, and the Hackney Hawks.

World Final Appearances

Individual World Championship
 1972 -  London, Wembley Stadium - 4th - 11pts
 1974 -  Göteborg, Ullevi - 9th - 8pts

World Team Cup
 1972 -  Olching, Olching Speedwaybahn (with Tommy Jansson / Jan Simensen / Anders Michanek /  Göte Nordin) 4th - 18pts (6)
 1974 -  Chorzów, Silesian Stadium (with Anders Michanek / Sören Sjösten / Tommy Jansson) - 2nd - 31pts (5)
 1976 -  London, White City Stadium (with Anders Michanek / Bengt Jansson / Bernt Persson  / Lars-Åke Andersson) - 3rd - 26pts (1)

Death
Löfqvist was diagnosed with a brain tumour and died in 1978 aged 33.

References

External links
www.hackneyhawks.co.uk

1944 births
1978 deaths
Swedish speedway riders
Hackney Hawks riders
Poole Pirates riders
West Ham Hammers riders
Sportspeople from Gotland County